St Pol de Léon's Church, Paul also known as Paul Parish Church is a parish church in the Church of England Diocese of Truro located in Paul, Cornwall, UK.

History and description
The church is said to have been founded in 490 by Paul Aurelian, a Welsh saint. The church building is medieval but was largely destroyed in a raid by the Spanish in 1595. It was rebuilt by 1600. The parish tower is constructed of granite with double buttresses. The tower contains six bells: two by Abraham Rudhall from 1727, and four by John Taylor & Co from 1950.

Robert Anning Bell, the Arts and Crafts movement artist, designed the memorial east window in the chancel. It honours Lieutenant William Torquil Macleod Bolitho who was killed on 24 May 1915 during the Second Battle of Ypres. The window is described by an advisor for the Diocese of Truro as  ... it must rank as one of the most important glass windows in Cornwall of any age. The window, installed in 1918, is currently (2015) in need of restoration at an estimated cost of £150,000. The stonework around the window is made from Polyphant stone, a soft stone that is crumbling away and will be replaced with closely matching stone from the Forest of Dean.

Memorials and burials
The Cornish language writers Nicholas Boson, Thomas Boson and John Boson are all buried in the churchyard, and a monument in the church by John Boson (to Arthur Hutchens, d. 1709) is the only surviving lapidary inscription in traditional Cornish. Within the village churchyard there is a memorial to Dolly Pentreath, reputedly and disputedly the last native speaker of Cornish. The memorial was placed there by Louis Lucien Bonaparte, a relative of Napoleon Bonaparte, and the Vicar of Paul in the 19th century. There is a monument to Capt. Stephen Hutchens (died 1709).

Gallery

References

Church of England church buildings in Cornwall
Grade II listed churches in Cornwall
Buildings and structures in Penzance